Two-way television can refer to:

 an early name (one of more than a dozen different ones) used for videophones during the period of the 1920s to the 1960s, 
 a name commonly used for interactive television.

Less commonly, it can also refer to:

 Closed-circuit television

Videotelephony